Daniel Fitzgerald may refer to:

Daniel Fitzgerald (Neighbours), fictional character on the Australian soap opera, Neighbours
Dan Fitzgerald (1942–2010), American college basketball coach
Daniel Fitzgerald (Gaelic footballer), see Brian Cuthbert
Daniel Fitzgerald (basketball) (born 1984)
Daniel Fitzgerald (referee) from 2012 New York Red Bulls season
Daniel Fitzgerald (writer), see Great Plains
Daniel Fitzgerald (actor) on BeastMaster (TV series)
Danny Fitzgerald (baseball) from Niagara Stars
Daniel J. Fitzgerald (1898–1990), American Massachusetts State Deputy of the Knights of Columbus